Rodolfo "Rodito" Taguinod Albano III is a Filipino politician from Cabagan, Isabela, Philippines. He currently serves as the governor of Isabela. Albano was a congressman of the First Legislative District of Isabela from 2013 to 2019.

References

External links
Province of Isabela Official Website

Living people
Governors of Isabela (province)
PDP–Laban politicians
Year of birth missing (living people)
Members of the House of Representatives of the Philippines from Isabela (province)
Ateneo de Manila University alumni
De La Salle University alumni